The sitcom 3rd Rock from the Sun has been nominated for and won a number of major television awards.

By award

American Cinema Editors
1996: Best Edited Half-Hour Series (Briana London for "Dick Like Me", nominated)
1998: Best Edited Half-Hour Series (Vince Humphrey for "Indecent Dick", nominated)

American Society of Cinematographers
1997: Outstanding Cinematography - Regular Series (Marc Reshovsky for "Nightmare on Dick Street", won)
1 win

Casting Society of America
1996: Best Casting - Comedy Pilot (won)
1996: Best Casting - Episodic Comedy (nominated)
1997: Best Casting - Episodic Comedy (nominated)
1998: Best Casting - Episodic Comedy (nominated)
1 win

Costume Designers Guild
1999: Excellence in Costume Design - Contemporary Series (Melina Root, nominated)

Directors Guild of America
1996: Outstanding Directing - Comedy Series (Robert Berlinger for "See Dick Continue to Run", nominated)

Emmy Awards
31 nominations, 8 wins

Golden Globe Awards
6 nominations, 2 wins

Satellite Awards
1996: Best Actor - Musical or Comedy Series (John Lithgow for playing "Dr. Dick Solomon", won)
1996: Best Actress - Musical or Comedy Series (Jane Curtin for playing "Dr. Mary Albright", won)
1996: Best Series - Musical or Comedy (nominated)
1997: Best Actress - Musical or Comedy Series (Jane Curtin for playing "Dr. Mary Albright", nominated)
1998: Best Actor - Musical or Comedy Series (John Lithgow for playing "Dr. Dick Solomon", nominated)
1998: Best Series - Musical or Comedy (nominated)
2 wins

Screen Actors Guild
6 nominations, 2 wins

TCA Awards
1996: Outstanding Achievement in Comedy (nominated)
1997: Outstanding Achievement in Comedy (nominated)
1997: Individual Achievement in Comedy (John Lithgow for playing "Dr. Dick Solomon", nominated)

By year

1996
Directors Guild of America Award: Outstanding Directing - Comedy Series (Robert Berlinger for  "See Dick Continue to Run", nominated)
Emmy Award: Outstanding Actor - Comedy Series (John Lithgow, won)
Emmy Award: Outstanding Directing - Comedy Series (James Burrows for "Pilot", nominated)
Emmy Award: Outstanding Hairstyling - Series (for "The Dicks They Are a Changin", nominated)
Golden Globe Award: Best Actor - Musical or Comedy Series (John Lithgow, won)
Golden Globe Award: Best Series - Musical or Comedy (won)
Golden Globe Award: Best Supporting Actress - (Mini)Series or TV Film (Kristen Johnston, nominated)
Satellite Award: Best Actor - Musical or Comedy Series (John Lithgow, won)
Satellite Award: Best Actress - Musical or Comedy Series (Jane Curtin, won)
Satellite Award: Best Series - Musical or Comedy (nominated)
Screen Actors Guild Award: Outstanding Actor - Comedy Series (John Lithgow, won)
Screen Actors Guild Award: Outstanding Actress - Comedy Series (Kristen Johnston, nominated)
Screen Actors Guild Award: Outstanding Cast - Comedy Series (nominated)

1997
Emmy Award: Outstanding Actor - Comedy Series (John Lithgow, won)
Emmy Award: Outstanding Choreography (for "A Nightmare on Dick Street", won)
Emmy Award: Outstanding Costume Design - Series (for "A Nightmare on Dick Street", won)
Emmy Award: Outstanding Hairstyling - Series (for "A Nightmare on Dick Street", nominated)
Emmy Award: Outstanding Series - Comedy (nominated)
Emmy Award: Outstanding Sound Mixing - Comedy Series or Special (for "A Nightmare on Dick Street", won)
Emmy Award: Outstanding Special Visual Effects (for "A Nightmare on Dick Street", nominated)
Emmy Award: Outstanding Supporting Actress - Comedy Series (Kristen Johnston, won)
Golden Globe Award: Best Actor - Musical or Comedy Series (John Lithgow, nominated)
Golden Globe Award: Best Series - Musical or Comedy (nominated)
Satellite Award: Best Actress - Musical or Comedy Series (Jane Curtin, nominated)
Screen Actors Guild Award: Outstanding Actor - Comedy Series (John Lithgow, won)
Screen Actors Guild Award: Outstanding Cast - Comedy Series (nominated)

1998
Emmy Award: Outstanding Actor - Comedy Series (John Lithgow, nominated)
Emmy Award: Outstanding Costume Design - Series (for "36! 24! 36! Dick!", nominated)
Emmy Award: Outstanding Directing - Comedy Series (Terry Hughes for "Dick and the Other Guy", nominated)
Emmy Award: Outstanding Guest Actor - Comedy Series (John Cleese for playing "Dr. Neesam" in "Dick and the Other Guy", nominated)
Emmy Award: Outstanding Guest Actress - Comedy Series (Jan Hooks for playing "Vicki Dubcek" in "Eat, Drink, Dick, Mary", nominated)
Emmy Award: Outstanding Series - Comedy (nominated)
Emmy Award: Outstanding Sound Mixing - Comedy Series or Special (for "36! 24! 36! Dick!", nominated)
Emmy Award: Outstanding Supporting Actress - Comedy Series (Kristen Johnston, nominated)
Golden Globe Award: Best Actor - Musical or Comedy Series (John Lithgow, nominated)
Satellite Award: Best Actor - Musical or Comedy Series (John Lithgow, nominated
Satellite Award: Best Series - Musical or Comedy (nominated)
Screen Actors Guild Award: Outstanding Cast - Comedy Series (nominated)

1999
Costume Designers Guild Awards: Excellence in Costume Design - Contemporary Series (Melina Root, nominated)
Emmy Award: Outstanding Actor - Comedy Series (John Lithgow, won)
Emmy Award: Outstanding Guest Actor - Comedy Series (William Shatner for playing "The Big Giant Head" in "Dick's Big Giant Headache: Parts 1 & 2", nominated)
Emmy Award: Outstanding Guest Actress - Comedy Series (Kathy Bates for playing "Charlotte Everly" in "Alien Hunter", nominated)
Emmy Award: Outstanding Guest Actress - Comedy Series (Laurie Metcalf for playing "Jennifer" in "What's Love Got to Do, Got to Do With Dick?" and "I Am Dick Pentameter", nominated)
Emmy Award: Outstanding Picture Editing - Multi-Camera Series (for "Dick and Taxes", nominated)
Emmy Award: Outstanding Sound Mixing - Comedy Series or Special (for "Dick's Big Giant Headache", nominated)
Emmy Award: Outstanding Supporting Actress - Comedy Series (Kristen Johnston, won)

2000
Emmy Award: Outstanding Actor - Comedy Series (John Lithgow, nominated)
Emmy Award: Outstanding Art Direction - Multi-Camera Series (for "Dial M For Dick", nominated)
Emmy Award: Outstanding Cinematography - Multi-Camera Series (for "Dick and Harry Fall in a Hole", nominated)
Emmy Award: Outstanding Sound Mixing - Comedy Series or Special (for "Dick and Harry Fall in a Hole", nominated)

2001
Emmy Award: Outstanding Actor - Comedy Series (John Lithgow, nominated)

References

3rd Rock from the Sun
3rd Rock from the Sun